Javier González may refer to:
 Javier González (racing driver) (born 1962), Mexican racing driver
 Javier González (footballer, born 1979), Paraguayan footballer
 Javier González Gómez (born 1974), retired Spanish footballer
 Javier González (footballer, born 1939) (1939–2018), Peruvian footballer
 Javier González Urruticoechea, aka Urruti, (1952–2001) Spanish footballer
 Javier González Panton (born 1983), Cuban volleyball player
 Javier González (politician), politician in Puerto Rico
 Javier Balboa Gonzalez (born 1990), Mexican gymnast
 Javier González (footballer, born 1988), Venezuelan footballer
 Javier González (weightlifter) (born 1949), Cuban weightlifter
 Javier González (basketball) (born 1989), basketball player
 Javier Alberto González (born 1979), Colombian cyclist